= Ammonium hexafluorotantalate =

Names
- IUPAC name Ammonium hexafluorotantalate

Identifiers
| CAS Number | 33380-11-9 |
| 3D model (JSmol) | Interactive image |
| ChemSpider | 103867795 |
| EC Number | 235-561-2 |
| PubChem CID | 22628874 |
| CompTox Dashboard (EPA) | DTXSID10187013 |
- InChI: InChI=1S/6FH.H3N.Ta/h6*1H;1H3;/q;;;;;;;+5/p-5 Key: RZFFBJSLSJWTAI-UHFFFAOYSA-I
- SMILES: [NH4+].F[Ta-](F)(F)(F)(F)F

Properties
| Chemical formula | F_{6}H_{4}NTa |
| Molar mass | 312.977 g·mol^{−1} |
| Appearance | White crystals or powder |
| Density | 3.819 g/cm^{3} |
| Solubility in water | soluble |

Hazards
- GHS labelling
| Pictograms | (GHS07: Exclamation mark) (GHS05: Corrosive) |
| Signal word | Danger |
- Except where otherwise noted, data are given for materials in their standard state (at 25 °C [77 °F], 100 kPa). Infobox references

Ammonium hexafluorotantalate is an inorganic chemical compound with the chemical formula NH_{4}TaF_{6}.

== Physical properties ==
Ammonium hexafluorotantalate forms white crystals of the hexagonal system, space group R3̅m. Unit cell parameters are a=7.70 and c=7.95, with 3 formulas per unit cell.
